Chan Fai Lui (born 28 March 1955) is a Hong Kong former cyclist. He competed in three events at the 1976 Summer Olympics.

References

External links
 

1955 births
Living people
Hong Kong male cyclists
Olympic cyclists of Hong Kong
Cyclists at the 1976 Summer Olympics
Place of birth missing (living people)
Cyclists at the 1974 Asian Games
Cyclists at the 1978 Asian Games
Cyclists at the 1978 Commonwealth Games
Commonwealth Games competitors for Hong Kong
Asian Games competitors for Hong Kong